The Baltic hawker (Aeshna serrata) is a species of hawker dragonfly native to eastern Europe and western Asia.

References

Aeshnidae
Insects described in 1856